Right On Brother is the fourth album by the American guitarist Boogaloo Joe Jones. It was recorded in 1970 and released on the Prestige label.

Reception

Allmusic awarded the album 3 stars stating "A mostly original program of solid, relaxed, and funky (if not quite inspirational) soul-jazz on this 1969 date".

Track listing 
All compositions by Ivan "Boogaloo" Joe Jones except where noted
 "Right On" (Joe Jones) - 5:42
 "Things Ain't What They Used to Be" (Ted Persons, Mercer Ellington) - 7:05
 "Poppin'" - 6:08
 "Someday We'll Be Together" (Jackey Beavers, Johnny Bristol, Harvey Fuqua) - 6:49
 "Brown Bag" - 5:06
 "Let It Be Me" (Gilbert Bécaud, Pierre Delanoë, Mann Curtis) - 5:29

Personnel 
Boogaloo Joe Jones - guitar
Rusty Bryant - tenor saxophone, alto saxophone
Charles Earland - organ
Jimmy Lewis - electric bass
Bernard Purdie - drums

References 

Boogaloo Joe Jones albums
1970 albums
Prestige Records albums
Albums recorded at Van Gelder Studio
Albums produced by Bob Porter (record producer)